Pygmaepterys paulboschi is a species of sea snail, a marine gastropod mollusk in the family Muricidae, the murex snails or rock snails.

Distribution
This marine species occurs in the Gulf of Oman.

References

Muricidae
Gastropods described in 1984